The southern common cuscus (Phalanger mimicus), also known as Australian cuscus, gray phalanger, and to-ili, is an arboreal marsupial endemic to Australia (Cape York), southern New Guinea and possibly the Aru Islands. Until recently, it was considered conspecific with P. intercastellanus, and before that also with P. orientalis.

References

Possums
Marsupials of Australia
Mammals of Queensland
Mammals described in 1922
Taxa named by Oldfield Thomas
Marsupials of New Guinea